Kirit Khan (29 October 1955 – 2006  ) was a Bengali-Indian sitar player.

Early life

Khan was born in Brahmanbaria in erstwhile East Bengal and later settled in Kolkata, India. He is the second son of Ustad Bahadur Khan, a Sarod artiste. Musician Ayet Ali Khan was his grandfather. His elder brother was Bidyut Khan.

At the age of seven, Khan started learning music. First he took his lessons on tabla and later on sitar from his father. He learned from him until his father passed away in 1989. In 1976, he appeared in front of audience with a duet concert (Sitar and Sarod) with his father. From then on he played Sitar at home and abroad consistently.

Performance in major concerts in India
Among his memorable concerts is a duet performance with his father in the 'Sursringer Music Conference' in Mumbai in 1986. 
In 1987 he was showered with appreciation for his solo Sitar recitals in Mumbai organized by 'Ustad Abdul Halim Zafar Khan Academy'.
In the same year (1987) he participated in a duet concert with his father in 'Tansen Music Conference'.
In 1991 he was highly appreciated at the 'Surdas Music Conference' in Kolkata.
In 1999 he was highly acclaimed by audience at the 'Dover lane Music Conference' in Kolkata.

Tours
He had toured different countries in the world performing with his Sitar since 1978. The first countries he toured are Russia, and Cuba. 
Then in 1988 he rendered his recitals in Germany, and England.
In 1989 he played sitar in Middle East.
In 1999 he performed in Denmark, Switzerland, Northern Ireland (Belfast), and Scotland (Edinburgh).
In 2003 he performed in South America (Colombia, Bolivia, and Peru), and Sweden.

Awards and recognition
In 1984, he obtained the title Suramani from the 'Haridas Music Conference', and later Surjhankar in Mumbai. 
In 1985 he was given a reception in Brahmanbaria, Bangladesh, as the soil's bright son, with a golden key as a token of their sincere appreciation.

Music direction in films
Besides playing sitar he also engaged himself as a music director in different films. He worked with his father as an assistant music director in Hindi Films Garam Hawa, Amabashya Ki Chand. 
He also worked as assistant Music director in Bangla films Natun Pata, Jukti Takko Goppo, Je Jekhane Dariye. 
He was the solo music director of the film Nilkanya. 
He started a documentary film called ‘Gharana and Parampara’ which has been sponsored by Government of India. The theme of the film was to make the younger generation aware of Parampara (Teacher-student interactive learning) and concept of Gharana (Schools of music).

Teaching sitar
Though a busy artiste he also engaged himself as a music teacher In Ustad Bahadur Khan Music Academy in Kolkata and thus played a role to spread Indian classical instrumental music. 
He was a visiting teacher on sitar in Indian Music Academy in Frankfurt, Germany.

References

External links
Pracheen Kala Kendra (Copyright © 2005), Baithak Programme
 
 ‘Music fest at Ravindra Bharati’ The Times of India, 28 October 2003
 'Sangeet Swarn: A golden chance for music lovers' The Tribune, Chandigarh, 28 October 2003

1955 births
2006 deaths
Sitar players
20th-century Indian singers
People from Brahmanbaria district
Singers from Kolkata
20th-century Indian male singers